Cornelius House may refer to:

In the United States
Cock-Cornelius House, Locust Valley, New York
Cornelius House (Mooresville, North Carolina)
Benjamin Cornelius Jr. House, Forest Grove, Oregon
Stratton–Cornelius House, Portland, Oregon
Charles and Theresa Cornelius House, Neillsville, Wisconsin